Château d'Autet is a château located in the Luberon hills of the commune of Viens in the Vaucluse department, Provence-Alpes-Côte d'Azur, France. Built in the 19th century as a hunting lodge, the dilapidated house and surrounding neglected estate was bought in 1998 by David Armstrong-Jones, 2nd Earl of Snowdon, who is reported to have paid £500,000. In addition to repairing the house, the Earl planted fields of lavender on the estate nearby.

References

External links

Châteaux in Vaucluse
Houses completed in the 19th century